The Women's Pole vault event at the 2011 World Championships in Athletics took place at the Daegu Stadium on August 28 and 30.

Anna Rogowska of Poland was the defending champion, while 2008 Olympic champion Yelena Isinbayeva had returned to form after a career break in 2010. American Jennifer Suhr had the two best clearances prior to the competition and Martina Strutz was ranked second in the world behind her. Silke Spiegelburg (the Diamond League leader), world indoor champion Fabiana Murer and Olympic medalist Svetlana Feofanova were the other main potential medalists.

The event was conducted in swirling winds.  World record holder Isinbayeva was the last to start, clearing her opening height but then struggling with her next three attempts, going under the bar on the last one.  World leader Suhr seemed off this night but cleared 4.70 on her second attempt, while Yarisley Silva set the Cuban national record at the same height on her third attempt.  Murer and previous world record holder Feofanova were clean through 4.75, but were pushed into a tie for second place by Strutz' German National Record 4.80 on her first attempt. Murer cleared on her second attempt while Feofanova missed all three attempts.  At 4.85 Murer tied her own National and Area record, clearing on her first attempt and making Strutz pass to 4.90 to try to win.  Neither cleared on their two attempts, then Murer had the bar raised to 4.92 for her final attempt.

Medalists

Records
Prior to the competition, the established records were as follows.

Qualification standards

Schedule

Results

Qualification
Qualification: Qualifying Performance 4.60 (Q) or at least 12 best performers (q) advance to the final.

Final

References

External links
Pole vault results at IAAF website

Pole vault
Pole vault at the World Athletics Championships
2011 in women's athletics